Sansani: The Sensation is a 1981 Hindi horror mystery film of Bollywood directed by Irshad and produced by Kavita Seth. This film was released under the banner of Panorama Pictures. Lead singers of the film are Asha Bhosle, Amit Kumar, Bhupinder Singh and Varsha Bhosle with the songs composed by Hemant Bhosle.

Plot
Two persons, namely Ajay and Prem come to a remote village. They go for a night stay to a nearby guest house from the railway station in the foggy night. Surprisingly, a series of murders happens immediately after their arrival and at the same time, in every night a sari-clad lady roams in the area of the burial ground. The police suspect Ajay and arrest him for the charge of the murders, but he escapes from police custody to solve the murder mystery.

Cast
 Vinod Mehra as Ajay Sachdev
 Bindiya Goswami as Nisha
 Prem Chopra as Prem Kumar
 Shreeram Lagoo as Kumar Rajdev
 Jagdeep as Dhanekapuri
 Jayshree Gadkar as Kamla Devi
 Gulshan Grover as Tribal Man
 Keshto Mukherjee as Juman
 Dina Pathak as Wilma
 Jagdish Raj as Mathur
 Viju Khote as Tribal Leader
 Shailendra Singh as Tony
 T. P. Jain as Amarnath
 Kavita as Dr. Mounika
 Jayashree T as Athanni Jaan
 Meena T as Chawani Jaan

References

External links
 

1981 films
1980s Hindi-language films
Indian horror films
1981 horror films